Richard Wallie Boston is a Canadian musician, composer and producer based in Los Angeles. He is known for his roles in Low Pop Suicide and for producing Rickie Lee Jones' album, Ghostyhead.

Early life and education
Richard Wallie Boston was born in Edmonton, Alberta, Canada. He studied jazz arrangement and composition.

Career
Boston played guitar for Belinda Carlisle's 1988 album, Heaven on Earth.  He was a member of Hand of Fate, working with John Keck to produce the 1990 album, Hand of Fate, and is credited for vocals. He played guitar for and produced Sky Cries Mary's 1991 EP, Exit at the Axis.

Boston subsequently worked extensively with Dave Allen of Low Pop Suicide, making a series of releases on World Domination Recordings. Boston was the band's frontman, singing and playing lead guitar, on their 1993 debut album On the Cross of Commerce, but both Allen and Jeff Ward exited the band. As the only founder left, their second LP, The Death of Excellence, was a more personal vehicle.

Exploring a more acoustic sound, Boston released one solo album in 1996, Numb, a verbatim copy of Low Pop Suicide's last release, the Unzipped EP.

In 1997, he partnered with Rickie Lee Jones in songwriting, playing, and production for her album Ghostyhead.

Boston was a member of The Januaries, which released two albums in 2000, The Januaries and The Girl's Insane.

Composer
Boston composed "You Know We're Gonna Hurt" for Joe Cocker's 1989 album, One Night of Sin. He composed eight of the songs on Lowen & Navarro's 1991 album, Walking on a Wire, and another for their 1993 album, Broken Moon.

In 2003, Boston was co-writer with Lili Haydn on the song "Come Here" on her album Light Blue Sun. Boston worked as composer on Alice Cooper's 2005 album, Dirty Diamonds for which he co-composed "Woman of Mass Distraction", "You Make Me Wanna", "Dirty Diamonds", "Zombie Dance", and "Stand".

Film songs and scores 
In 1987, with Lowen & Navarro, Boston wrote "It's Time To Move",<ref>Police Academy 4: Citizens On Patrol (1987)' at AFI Catalog.</ref> a song for the film 1987 Police Academy 4: Citizens on Patrol. He also worked with Jeff "Skunk" Baxter on songs for the American romantic comedy film Roxanne directed by Fred Schepisi. The songs were "Party Tonight", written by Jeffrey Baxter (as Jeff "Skunk" Baxter) and Rick Boston, "Can This Be Love", written by Jeffrey Baxter (as Jeff "Skunk" Baxter), Rick Boston, Janet Minto, and Pamela.

In 1988, Boston was the songwriter for "She's Cruel" and "Killer Groove" for Death Spa, an American horror film directed by Michael Fischa and starring William Bumiller, Brenda Bakke, and Merritt Butrick. He also wrote "Rebuilding the Big House" for the film A Nightmare on Elm Street 4: The Dream Master.

In 1993, as a side project with Dave Allen as the Crash Baptists, Boston composed music for The Harvest, a 1993 thriller directed by David Marconi.

In 2008, Boston and John O'Brien composed a big band-style arrangement of the Iron Man theme song for the film Iron Man (2008 version), directed by Jon Favreau.

 Producer 
Boston worked with John Keck to produce the 1990 album, Hand of Fate. In 1997, he partnered with Rickie Lee Jones in songwriting, playing, and production for her album Ghostyhead''.

In 2006, Boston worked as producer with artists Rodleen Getsic and Norwood Fisher of Fishbone on Getsic's song, "The Reaper".

Selected discography
Solo

With Hand of Fate

With Sky Cries Mary

With Low Pop Suicide

With Rickie Lee Jones

With The Januaries

The Rick Boston Jamie Cohen Project

As composer

References

Citations

Works cited

Further reading

External links

Somewhere Nice To Fall — The Somewhat Acknowledged Low Pop Suicide and Rick Boston Webpage

Year of birth missing (living people)
Living people
20th-century Canadian composers
20th-century Canadian male musicians
21st-century Canadian composers
21st-century Canadian male musicians
Canadian film score composers
Canadian male composers
Canadian record producers
Canadian rock musicians
Canadian expatriates in the United States
Musicians from Edmonton
Musicians from Los Angeles
Record producers from Los Angeles